Chen Jinyan (born January 22, 1988) is a Chinese fencer. At the 2012 Summer Olympics, she competed in the Women's foil, defeated 6-15 in the third round by Valentina Vezzali of Italy.

References

1988 births
Living people
Chinese female fencers
Olympic fencers of China
Fencers at the 2012 Summer Olympics
Asian Games medalists in fencing
Fencers at the 2006 Asian Games
Fencers at the 2010 Asian Games
Asian Games silver medalists for China
Asian Games bronze medalists for China
Medalists at the 2006 Asian Games
Medalists at the 2010 Asian Games
Fencers from Guangdong
People from Nanhai District
21st-century Chinese women